Qaleh Now (also Romanized as Qal‘eh Now, Ghal‘eh Now, Qalah Nau, and Qal‘eh-ye Now) is a village in Gazik Rural District, Gazik District, Darmian County, South Khorasan Province, Iran. At the 2006 census, its population was 29, in 6 families.

References 

Populated places in Darmian County